Bullet is a surname. Notable people with the surname include:

 Gabriel Bullet (1921–2011), Swiss Roman Catholic prelate
 Jean-Baptiste Bullet (1669–1775), French writer and professor
 Pierre Bullet ( 1639–1716), French architect